Moldova has a well-established wine industry. With a production of around 2 million hectolitres of wine (as of 2018), it is the 11th largest European wine-producing country. The remaining  are vineyards planted in villages around the houses used to make home-made wine. Many families have their own recipes and strands of grapes that have been passed down through the generations. There are 3 historical wine regions: Valul lui Traian (south west), Stefan Voda (south east) and Codru (center),  destined for the production of wines with protected geographic indication.

In 2014, Moldova was the twentieth largest wine producing country in the world. Most of the country's commercial wine production is for export; 67 million bottles of wine are exported annually, including to  Poland, Romania, Russia and United States.

History

Fossils of Vitis teutonica vine leaves near the Naslavcia village in the north of Moldova indicate that grapes grew here approximately 6 to 25 million years ago. The size of grape seed imprints found near the Varvarovca village, which date back to 2800 BC, prove that at that time the grapes were already being cultivated. The grapegrowing and wine-making in the area between the Nistru and Prut rivers, which began 4000–5000 years ago, had periods of rises and falls but has survived through all the changing social and economic conditions.

By the end of the 3rd century BC, trading links were established between the local population and the Greeks and from 107 AD with the Romans, a fact which strongly influenced the intense development of the grape-growing and wine-making.

After the formation of the Moldavian feudal state in the 14th century, grape-growing began to develop and flourished in the 15th century during the kingdom of Stephen the Great, who promoted the import of high quality varieties and the improvement of the quality of wine, which was one of the chief exports of Moldova throughout the medieval period, especially to Poland, Ukraine and Russia.After the Treaty of Bucharest in 1812, when the region became a province of the Russian Empire, the wine industry flourished again. The main varieties were the traditional ones: Rară Neagră, Plavai, Galbena, Zghiharda, Batuta Neagră, Fetească Albă, Fetească Neagră, Tămâioasa, Cabasia and many other local, Hungarian, Bulgarian, Greek, and Turkish varieties. In this period, the grape growers gained governmental support and by 1837 the vineyard area in Bessarabia reached 14,000 hectares, and the wine production reached 12 million litres.
The second half of the 19th century saw an intensive planting of newly introduced French varieties, such as Pinot blanc, Pinot noir, Pinot gris, Aligote, Cabernet Sauvignon, Sauvignon blanc, Gamay, Muscat blanc. It was at this time that wines like Negru de Purcari and Romanesti, which have made Moldova famous as a fine wine producer, began to be produced.

After the phylloxera damage at the end of the 19th century, it was only in 1906 that the vineyards began to recover with grafted planting material. By 1914 Bessarabia had the biggest vineyard area in the Russian Empire.

Both World Wars damaged the Moldolvan vineyards and the wine industry considerably. The re-establishment of Moldavian vineyards began during Soviet years, in the 1950s. Over 150,000 hectares were planted in 10 years, and by 1960 the total vineyard area had reached 220,000 hectares.

In 2006, a diplomatic conflict with Russia resulted in the 2006 Russian ban of Moldovan and Georgian wines, damaging the wine industry of Moldova significantly, as Russia remains the largest importer of Moldovan wines by far. A fresh ban was imposed in September 2013, as a result of Moldova's announcement of plans to sign a draft association treaty with the European Union.

Wine growing regions in Moldova
In Moldova four regions for wine growing are to be found:
 Bălți (northern zone)
 Codru (central zone)
 Purcari (south-eastern zone)
 Cahul (southern zone)

The most important region - the Southern area - is suitable for red sweet and semi-sweet wines. White wines have a high content of alcohol. Micro-regions like Taraclia, Ciumai, Comrat, Ceadir-Lunga, Baurci, Cazaiac, Tomai, Cimislia etc. are also in the southern region.

Grape varieties

Moldovan viticulture is characterized by a large variety of grapes:

Local varieties
Only a few local varieties can still be found in Moldova today:
Fetească albă: Indigenous white variety;
Fetească regală: White variety, a natural cross between Fetească albă and Furmint;
Rară Neagră: Red variety traditionally used mostly for blending with other varieties, e.g. the famous Negru de Purcari. Responsible for the fame of the Purcari wines in the 18th century, before Cabernet Sauvignon was introduced. Total area planted - 170 hectares mostly in the Purcari region;
Fetească neagră: Red grape variety;
Plavai: White variety, popular in the 19th century and at the beginning of the 20th century. This variety is now rare;
Busuioacă albă: white aromatic variety.

Introduced varieties
White varieties: Chardonnay, Sauvignon blanc, Aligoté, Pinot gris, Pinot blanc, Riesling, Traminer, Muscat, Silvaner, Müller-Thurgau, Rkatsiteli.

Red varieties: Cabernet Sauvignon, Merlot, Pinot noir, Malbec, Saperavi, Gamay.

Recently: Syrah, Cabernet Franc, Petit Verdot, Carignan, Montepulciano, Sémillon, Ugni blanc,  and Tempranillo were conditionally registered for trial.

Divin
Divin - represents the name, patented in the Republic of Moldova, of the country's brandy, produced in conformity with the classic technology of cognac production.

Cellars

The Moldovan wine collection "Mileștii Mici", with almost 2 million bottles, is the largest wine collection in the world, according to the Guinness Book. It stretches for 250 km, of which only 120 km are currently in use.

The Cricova winery also has an extensive network of tunnels that stretch for 120 km.

Wine industry
The Moldova Wine Guild is a non-profit association established in August 2007 by several of Moldova's leading private wineries, i.e. Acorex Wine Holding, Vinaria Bostavan, Chateau Vartely, DK-Intertrade, Dionysos-Mereni, Lion-Gri, and Vinaria Purcari.

Together, the wineries export more than one third of all Moldovan wine. The member wineries are united by their desire to raise Moldova's profile as a major European wine producing country. To accomplish this goal, the members work together to promote their wines on the international market through joint marketing initiatives and to educate the international wine trade and press about Moldova.

Moldovan wineries

Asconi Winery
Aroma
Cricova
KVINT
Mileștii Mici
Purcari
Romănești

See also

Moldovan cuisine
Wine competition

References

External links

 www.winemoldova.com – the association of Moldovan small wine producers 
 www.vinmoldova.md – information about the Moldovan wine industry
 The unexplored wine region of Moldova /FoxNews.com/